The double cut and join (DCJ) model is a model for genome rearrangement used to define an edit distance between genomes based on gene order and orientation, rather than nucleotide sequence. It takes the fundamental units of a genome to be synteny blocks, maximal sections of DNA conserved between genomes. It focuses on changes due to genome rearrangement operations such as inversions, translocations as well as the creation and absorption of circular intermediates.

A genome is described as a directed, edge labeled graph with each vertex having degree 1 or 2.  Edges are labeled as synteny blocks,  vertices of degree 1 represent telomeres, and vertices of degree 2 representing adjacencies between blocks.  This requires that the genome consist of cycles and paths. Each component is called a chromosome. The beginning of each edge is called the tail, the end of each edge is called the head; together heads and tails are known as extremities. Vertices are described by their roles as heads and tails of blocks, for instance, in the figure, the adjacency which forms the head of marker 1 and the tail of marker 2 is labelled (h1, t2), the telomere formed by the head of 2 is (h2). A double cut and join (DCJ) operation consists of one of the following four transformations:

(i) breaking two adjacencies (a, b) and (c, d) to create two more adjacencies, (a, c) and (b,d)
(ii) taking an adjacency (a, b) and a telomere (c) to create a new adjacency and telomere, either as (a, c), (b) or (b,c), (a). 
(iii) taking two telomeres (a) and (b) and creating a new adjacency (a, b)
(iv) breaking an adjacency (a, b) to create the two telomeres (a) and (b).

Mathematical Results

The DCJ distance defines a metric space. Note that each operation has an inverse: (i) and (ii) are their own inverses, and (iii) is the inverse of (iv). Thus . The triangle inequality  holds because a series of DCJ operations transforming   to 

If , we see that the adjacency graph is composed entirely of paths of length 1, connecting two telomeres, and cycles of length 2, connecting two adjacencies. We can use this fact to calculate . Then  The proof shows that each DCJ operation can decrease  by no more than 1, and that if , there exists an operation decreasing . This proves that  is always defined, and gives a method for its calculation. Since it is easy to count cycles and paths,  can be found in linear time.

References

Genomics